Charles Edward Johnson Jr. (born July 20, 1971) is an American former professional baseball player. He played as a catcher in Major League Baseball with the Florida Marlins (1994–1998, 2001–2002), the Los Angeles Dodgers (1998), the Baltimore Orioles (1999–2000), the Chicago White Sox (2000), the Colorado Rockies (2003–2004), and the Tampa Bay Devil Rays (2005).

He was a member of the  world champion Florida Marlins team and, is one of only three catchers in Major League history to catch at least 100 games in a single season without committing an error.

Early life and major League career
Johnson was born in Fort Pierce, Florida where he graduated from Fort Pierce Westwood High School in Fort Pierce, Florida. He was drafted by the Montreal Expos in the first round of the 1989 Major League Baseball Draft. He did not sign, and decided to enroll at the University of Miami, where he played for the Miami Hurricanes baseball team. He was drafted by the Florida Marlins in the first round of the 1992 Major League Baseball Draft. He played with the A-level Kane County Cougars in 1993 and the AA Portland Sea Dogs.

In 1995, Johnson's reputation as a skilled defensive player was solidified when he became the fourth catcher in Major League history to win a Gold Glove Award in his rookie season, joining Johnny Bench, Carlton Fisk and Sandy Alomar Jr. Although his offensive statistics weren't impressive, he made up for those shortcomings by helping his team with his superior defensive skills. In 1996, Johnson caught Al Leiter's no-hitter against the Colorado Rockies. Johnson set a Major League record in 1997 by playing in 123 games without committing a single error, earning him his first All-Star selection, and helping the Marlins win the 1997 World Series against the Cleveland Indians. Johnson led the Marlins in the Series with 10 hits, batting .357 including one home run. Along with winning his third consecutive Gold Glove Award in 1997, he also caught his second no-hitter when Kevin Brown no-hit the Giants on June 10.

In , the Marlins traded Johnson along with Bobby Bonilla, Jim Eisenreich, Gary Sheffield and Manuel Barriosto to the Los Angeles Dodgers in exchange for Mike Piazza and Todd Zeile. After finishing the season with the Dodgers, he played for two years in the American League with the Baltimore Orioles and the Chicago White Sox.

In 2001 he was traded back to the Marlins, where he hit .285 with 16 home runs by mid-season to earn his second All-Star berth. He would also catch his third no hitter when A. J. Burnett no hit the San Diego Padres on May 12. The only Marlins no-hitters Johnson has not caught for Florida were in 2006, when Aníbal Sánchez threw a no-hitter in Dolphin Stadium against the Arizona Diamondbacks, 2013 when Henderson Álvarez no-hit the Detroit Tigers, and 2017 when Edinson Vólquez no-hit the Diamondbacks.

After the 2002 season, the Marlins traded Johnson to the Colorado Rockies where he played for two seasons.
On April 27, 2004, he, rookie Matt Holliday, and Jeromy Burnitz combined to slug back-to-back-to-back home runs against the Marlins, the sixth such occasion in franchise history.  After playing for Colorado, he ended his career with the Tampa Bay Devil Rays, playing his final game on June 11, 2005 at the age of 33.

Career statistics
In a twelve-season major league career covering 1,188 games, Johnson had a .245 batting average along with 167 home runs, 570 runs batted in and a .993 fielding percentage. His .993 fielding percentage ranks 16th all-time among major league catchers. Along with his four Gold Glove Awards, Johnson twice led National League catchers in fielding percentage, and once each in baserunners caught stealing and assists. During his playing career, he ranked second only to Iván Rodríguez in throwing out baserunners, with a 39% average. He earned two All-Star berths as well as winning a World Series during his career. His three no hitters caught ties him with several other players for third place on the all-time list behind the four no hitters caught by Jason Varitek and Carlos Ruiz. Johnson played more games as a catcher than any other player in Marlins history (582).

He now lives in Miami with his wife Rhonda.  They have two sons. Brandon, who plays college football as a wide receiver for the University of Tennessee and Beau, who plays college football as a tight end for Georgia Southern University. Johnson is a cousin of former Major Leaguer Fred McGriff. He is a member of the Portland Sea Dogs Hall of Fame.

Personal life
Johnson’s son, Brandon, is a wide receiver for the Denver Broncos in the National Football League (NFL).

References

External links

1971 births
Living people
People from Fort Pierce, Florida
Baseball players from Florida
Major League Baseball catchers
Florida Marlins players
Los Angeles Dodgers players
Baltimore Orioles players
Chicago White Sox players
Colorado Rockies players
Tampa Bay Devil Rays players
Gold Glove Award winners
National League All-Stars
Miami Hurricanes baseball players
Kane County Cougars players
Portland Sea Dogs players
Jupiter Hammerheads players
Baseball players at the 1991 Pan American Games
Pan American Games bronze medalists for the United States
Baseball players at the 1992 Summer Olympics
Olympic baseball players of the United States
African-American baseball players
Pan American Games medalists in baseball
Medalists at the 1991 Pan American Games
21st-century African-American sportspeople
20th-century African-American sportspeople